As the economy of China has rapidly developed, issues of labor relations have evolved. Prior to this reform, Chinese citizens were only allowed to work where they originated from. Since 1978 when China began labor force reforms the overwhelming majority of the labor force were either working at State owned enterprises or as farm workers in the rural countryside. However, over time China began to reform and by the late 90's many had moved from the countryside into the cities in hopes of higher paying jobs and more opportunities. The only connection between the countryside and the city soon became that there was a huge floating population connecting them. Independent unions are illegal in China with only the All-China Federation of Trade Unions permitted to operate. China has been the largest exporter of goods in the world since 2009. Not only that, in 2013 China became the largest trading nation in the world. As China moved away from their planned economy and more towards a market economy the government has brought on many reforms. The aim of this shift in economies was to match the international standards set by the World Trade Organization and other economic entities. The All-China Federation of Trade Unions (ACTFU) that was established to protect the interests of national and local trade unions failed to represent the workers, but instead failed to do so leading to the 2010 crackdowns. However these strikes were centered around foreign companies.

Background

One of the hallmarks of China's socialist economy was its promise of employment to all able and willing to work and job-security with virtually lifelong tenure. Reformers targeted the labor market as unproductive because industries were frequently overstaffed to fulfill socialist goals and job-security reduced workers' incentive to work. This socialist policy was pejoratively called the iron rice bowl. The iron rice bowl in 1978 ended collective farming and was then replaced by the "household responsibility system". It provided an informal market for farmers to increase prices above government ceilings placed on goods.

In 1979–1980, the state reformed factories by giving wage increases to workers, which was immediately offset by sharply rising inflation rates of 6%–7%. In the previous year, the inflation rate only rose a small one percent. This was largely because of two elements, price controls were adjusted and there was limited economic reforms that regarded SOEs expenditures. The state remedied this problem, in part, by distributing wage subsidies.

The reforms also dismantled the iron rice bowl, which meant it witnessed a rise in unemployment in the economy. In 1979, immediately after the iron rice bowl was dismantled, there were 20 million unemployed people. Official Chinese statistics reveal that 4.2% of the total urban workforce was unemployed in 2004, although other estimates have reached 10%. As part of its newly developing social security legislation, China has an unemployment insurance system. At the end of 2003, more than 103.7 million people were participating in the plan, and 7.4 million laid-off employees had received benefits.

The 10-percent sample showed that approximately three-fourths of the labor force worked in the agricultural sector. According to the National Bureau of Statistics, in the mid-1980s more than 120 million people worked in the non agricultural sector. The sample revealed that men occupied the great majority of leadership positions. The average worker was about thirty years old, and three out of every four workers were under forty-five years of age. The working population had a low education level. Less than 40 percent of the labor force had more than a primary school education, and 30 percent were illiterate or semi-literate.

In mid-1982 the overall unemployment rate was estimated to be about 5 percent. Of the approximately 25 million unemployed, 12 million were men and 13 million were women. The unemployment rate was highest in the northeast and lowest in the south. The unemployment rates were higher than those of East Asian, Southeast Asian, and Pacific island countries for which data were available but were lower than the rates found in North America and Europe. Virtually all of the unemployed persons in cities and towns were under twenty years of age.

By the 1990s and 2000s, agriculture has remained the largest employer, though its proportion of the workforce has steadily declined; between 1991 and 2001 it dropped from about 60% to 40% of the total. The manufacturing labor force has also become smaller at a slower rate, partially because of reforms implemented at many of the state-run enterprises. Such reforms and other factors have increased unemployment and underemployment in both urban and rural areas. Women have been a major labor presence in China since the People's Republic was established. Some 40–45 percent of all women over age 15 are employed.

China's estimated employed labor force in 2005 totaled 791.4 million persons, about 60% of the total population. During 2003, 49% of the labor force worked in agriculture, forestry, and fishing; 22% in mining, manufacturing, energy, and construction industries; and 29% in the services sector and other categories. In 2004 some 25 million persons were employed by 743,000 private enterprises. Urban wages rose rapidly from 2004 to 2007, at a rate of 13 to 19% per year with average wages near $200/month in 2007.

In the Seventh National Population Census conducted by the National Bureau of Statistics of China the population in China is 1.4 billion. China's population growth has slowed since the 20th century and has maintained a mild growth in population. The average household size in China is 2.62 people, this can be attributed to the rise in better work opportunities and conditions for those living in the city. In higher education, there were 218.36 million people with a university level of education. In addition, illiteracy rates dropped from 4.08% to 2.67%. The reform and push for education in China has led them to create more skilled workers centered around urban areas. Regarding Urban and rural populations thee are 901.99 million living in urban spaces which account for 63.89% of the population compared to 509.79 million people living in rural areas of China which account for the 36.11% remaining percent. The continuous shift between rural workers migrating into cities for more opportunities continue. This can be attributed to growth in industrialization, information, and agricultural modernization. Many of these rural residents permanently left their homes to gain permanent urban residency.

However, not all have been able to move the transition smoothly. The number of people who fall under the "floating population" meaning they are living in an area that is not where they are originally registered from totals 492.76 million. Of this population 124.84 million work in other provinces in China from where they live. Furthermore, this exhibits that China needs to reform much of their labor as migrant workers are moving all around the country in search of work. This is a result of market forces penetrating into China in the early eighties that have brought on a plethora of issues, one of them including the "floating population". The basis for these workers are that they theoretically could not access housing and other things that urban hukous could access.

Despite improvements in living standards, much of the labor force continues to work under horrendous conditions. As noted by Kenichi Ohmae:

"China exhibits capitalism in the rawest form. A factory manager in Guangzhou finds that the eyesight of some workers deteriorates as a result of the work they do. He fires them with one week’s pay. They are no longer his responsibility. Were a Japanese manager to act like this, he would risk imprisonment. Were a U.K. firm to do this, it might be both sued and prosecuted."

All-China Federation of Trade Unions
The All-China Federation of Trade Unions (ACFTU) was established in 1925 to represent the interests of national and local trade unions and trade union councils. The ACFTU reported a membership of 130 million, out of an estimated 248 million urban workers, at the end of 2002. Chinese trade unions are organized on a broad industrial basis. Membership is open to those who rely on wages for the whole or a large part of their income, a qualification that excludes most agricultural workers. In theory, membership is not compulsory, but in view of the unions' role in the distribution of social benefits, the economic pressure to join is great. The lowest unit is the enterprise union committee. Individual trade unions also operate at the provincial level, and there are trade union councils that coordinate all union activities within a particular area and operate at county, municipal, and provincial levels. At the top of the movement is the ACFTU, which discharges its functions through a number of regional federations.

In theory the appropriate trade union organizations have been consulted on the level of wages as well as on wage differentials, but in practice their role in these and similar matters has been insignificant. They have not engaged in collective bargaining or general strikes, as their principal duties have included assisting the party and promoting production. In fulfilling these tasks, they have had a role in enforcing labor discipline. From the point of view of the membership, the most important activities have concerned the social and welfare services. Thus, the unions have looked after industrial safety, organized social and cultural activities, and, provided services such as clinics, rest and holiday homes, hostels, libraries, and clubs. They also administer old-age pensions, workers' insurance, disability benefits, and other welfare schemes. More recently, however, reforms of the social security system have involved moving the responsibility for pensions and other welfare to the provinces.

Trade Union law
The Trade Union Law in China forces the all trade unions in China dependent with the Communist Party of China. According to Article 4 of Trade Union Law of the People's Republic of China, which was passed in 1992, and revised in 2001 and 2009, "The trade union must abide by and uphold the Constitution, take the Constitution as the fundamental activity criterion, center on economic construction, adhere to the socialist road, adhere to the people's democratic dictatorship, adhere to the leadership of the Communist Party of China, adhere to Marxism-Leninism, Mao Zedong Thought and Deng Xiaoping Theory, adhere to reform and opening up, Carry out work independently in accordance with the trade union charter."

Labor laws

In China there exist labor laws which, if fully enforced, would greatly alleviate common abuses such as not paying workers. In 2006, a new labor law was proposed and submitted for public comment. Enacted in 2008, the Labor Contract Law of the People's Republic of China permits collective bargaining in a form analogous to that standard in Western economies, although the only legal unions would continue to be those affiliated with the All-China Federation of Trade Unions, the Communist Party's official union organization. The new law has support from labor activists, but was opposed by some foreign corporations, including the American Chamber of Commerce and the European Chamber of Commerce. There is some expectation that the law would be enforced. In 2010 a substantial increase in labor related cases brought to court in 2008 was reported.

As per article 36 and article 41 of newly amended Chinese Labour law, the permissible working hour has been set that legally restricts employers from forcefully making workers overwork. According to the article 36 of the law, laborers can not be made work for more than 8 hours a day making 44 hours a week. However, the laws have been violated frequently and are not strictly enforced by regulators. A 2019 survey showed the actual average work time to be about 47 hours, with about 62% reporting actually working more than 40 hours a week. In 2021, the Chinese government announced that it would regulate the 996 working hour system.

In 2020 a law was introduced which banned the use of multiplayer video games for the purposes of organizing a labor union. In the same year, due to COVID-19 Pandemic, the government allowed enterprises to keep adjustment of salaries optional and thereby enabling the business to refrain from offering wage hike to the workers.

Foreign companies
Foreign direct investment (FDI) in China has increased from $1.8 billion in 1983 to $691.9 billion in 2006 . According to BBC China has overtaken the US as the world's top country for direct foreign investment. Over the years this has been able to happen as the Chinese government has gradually the amount of foreign business that can operate in China. As these restrictions are pulled back in China and more foreign companies begin to invest and maybe move their operations that China needs to reform to not allow any malpractices to continue. An ongoing effort to organize Chinese operations of foreign companies succeeded in 2006 at Wal-Mart. Wal-Mart was the most publicized case in China where they failed to recognize the ACFTU unions resulting in Wal-Mart agreeing to unionize all 62 Wal-Mart super stores. The campaign is projected to include Eastman Kodak, Dell and other companies. It was reported in 2008 that problems with sweatshops persist. By Fall, 2008 it was apparent that union organizing efforts were widespread with emphasis on foreign corporations. Multinational Corporations are the driving force behind China's labor system. However that leads the outcome of this to be uncertain for the future as foreign corporations push for better working environments while also attempting to keep their costs down. It is unclear how to operate and create a sustainable work environment in China.

Floating Population 
In China, more often than not citizens living in the countryside and rural areas have to move to find work. In China there are an estimated 150 million members of this "floating population" who often find themselves migrating away from their homes and families to urban cities and areas. More often than not these workers spend up to 18 hours a day working in dangerous conditions for only $100 dollars a month. These workers often don't sign a contract so as a result they are offered no vacation time or overtime pay. High population allows contractors and companies to abuse these workers for labor because they are so easily replaceable. However the issue is not whether that Chinese labor standards are too low, because according to the 1994 Labor Law, sought to "require employers to sign contracts with workers that guarantee minimum wage, monthly distribution of wages, a forty-four-hour work week, mandatory rest and vacation, and overtime pay". The Chinese labor laws are even more generous than in some developed countries however, these standards are ignored by both employer and employee often. The reason for which the labor standards in China are not enforced is due to the lack of incentive for any local or national official to do so. Many of these officials' performance evaluations are primarily focused on economic growth within their respected area. Not only this, the motives of these officials are generally viewed above the needs of a highly replaceable, uneducated worker who is from a different part of the country.

Honda strikes and other events in 2010

Honda
In May 2010 a strike was permitted to proceed against a Honda transmission and parts plant employing 1,900 in Foshan. The strike, which began on 17 May 2010, has resulted in suspension of operations at 4 Honda assembly plants. The main issue appears to be money with a substantial raise being demanded. Wages at the plant currently average $150 a month, a rate somewhat low for the area. The workers involved are mostly young high school and vocational school graduates with no apparent political agenda. A 24% wage increase was offered by Honda which for many workers would be an increase of about 366 renminbi ($54) a month. News reports on 5 June 2010 reported settlement of the strike with a pay raise of about 34% and other benefits giving workers at the plant a wage of about 300 dollars a month. A second strike, this time at an exhaust-systems plant, also in Foshan, followed. And a third, at a Honda lock plant in Zhongshan, where workers demanded the right to form an independent union. The strike at the Zhongshan was broken in a few days by a combination of concessions and hiring replacement workers.

Foxconn
On 1 June 2010 it was announced by Foxconn Technology Group, a major manufacturer of electronic products for export, that they would increase wages by 30%. For example, a worker previously paid 900 renminbi ($131.77) will be paid 1,200 renminbi effective immediately. Foxconn had been plagued by worker shortages and a number of worker suicides. A few days later a further increase was announced raising wages of employees who have worked for the company for three months to $294 a month. Experts such as Andy Xie believe that there is ample scope for increased wages in China due to its superior infrastructure as compared to competing low wage alternatives.

Toyota
On 18 June 2010 there were news reports of strikes at two Toyota parts plants in Tianjin, both operated by a Chinese subsidiary Toyoda Gosei. On 22 June 2010 it was reported that a Toyota assembly plant had been closed due to a strike at a supplier.

Minimum wage increases and other events

Effective 1 July 2010 the minimum wage in Beijing was raised 20% to 960 renminbi ($140) a month. In Shenzhen the minimum wage will be increased to 1,100 renminbi, about $161 a month in July. In June 2010 there were reports of several other incidents including one in which a government controlled ACFTU union was reported to be negotiating regarding wages with Kentucky Fried Chicken. On 10 June 2010 strikes were reported in 5 additional cities.

A copy-cat strike at a former state-owned, now privatized, textile factory in Pingdingshan, the Pingdingshan Cotton Textile Co., where workers with 20 years service toil for little more than $100 a month was reported on 8 June 2010 by The Toronto Star. According to the Star information about such strikes is not being publicized inside China; information about strikes involving foreign or Taiwanese owned factories often receives more attention.

During the initial Honda strikes the media in China was permitted to report on them, but as strikes spread reporting was suppressed.

TESCO Jinhua 
Workers at Tesco in the city of Jinhua, in Zhejiang province, which is due to close at the end of the year 2011, became concerned it would shut earlier after it began discounting goods. They asked management to pay them the overtime they were due and terminate their contracts so they would receive wages immediately, according to Zhejiang Online. The workers may have been alarmed by previous cases in China where bosses have closed businesses overnight and fled without paying workers. 
Workers feel that some will have no choice but to leave and argue they should be entitled to one month's pay for each year of employment, the compensation set out in redundancy laws. "Another major factor is that workers are much more determined to stand up for their rights and interests than five years ago … They are much more aware of what they are entitled to, not only legally, but what they feel they [need] to have a decent living for example. There's a higher sense of self-worth". More than 100 workers blockaded a Tesco in Jinhua. (source Zhejiang Online)

State-owned enterprises in China 

State Owned Enterprises (SOEs) are an important piece to the Chinese economy. These institutions have gained an important role in the global economy today. In 2000 there were only 27 SOEs in the Fortune Global 500 compared to 2017, there are 102. Only 9 of the 27 SOEs in 2000 were from China compared to 75 of the 102 SOEs they account for in 2017.  This increase has led to many more Chinese citizens obtaining stable jobs that also put them at odds with those working at foreign companies.

Slave labor

Forced labor exists in the Chinese system under both legal and illegal guises. Unfree labor in China is not generally addressed by the Chinese authorities, local news organizations, or local NGOs as it is considered a sensitive subject.

Brick kiln slavery
Brick kilns in China, like around the world, have been the site of unfree labor with most enslaved laborers being the youth, the elderly, and mentally disabled adults. Local communities and authorities are often involved in the trafficking of the victims. These workplaces are knows as “black kilns.” In 2007 a particularly gruesome case came to light as the result parents organizing to find their kidnapped children.

Forced internships
Student's in China's vocational schools are forced to accept minimally paid and unpaid internships at local manufacturing firms, often completely outside the industry which the student is being trained to go into. Students are threatened with having their graduation withheld if they do not participate in these internships. Firms which have faced allegations of using forced student labor include foreign manufacturing giants Foxconn and Quanta.

Construction industry
China's construction industry is closely regulated and many of those working in it are illegal migrants without work permission. Workers regularly face a lack of formal employment contracts, wage withholding, excessive and illegal overtime, and a complete dependence on their employer for food and shelter. Wages are often withheld as long as a calendar year. Around Chinese New Year it is common for workers in the construction to protest their wage arrears. It is estimated that half of Chinese construction workers have had their wages withheld at some point in their career. In 2017 Ministry of Human Resources and Social Security announced that wage arrears would be eradicated by 2020.

Xinjiang

In March 2020, the Chinese government was found to be using the Uyghur minority for forced labor, inside sweat shops. According to a report published then by the Australian Strategic Policy Institute (ASPI), no fewer than around 80,000 Uyghurs were forcibly removed from the region of Xinjiang and used for forced labor in at least twenty-seven corporate factories. According to the Business and Human Rights resource center, corporations such as Abercrombie & Fitch, Adidas, Amazon, Apple, BMW, Fila, Gap, H&M, Inditex, Marks & Spencer, Nike, North Face, Puma, PVH, Samsung, and UNIQLO have each sourced from these factories prior to the publication of the ASPI report.

Numerous other allegations of forced labor related to the Xinjiang re-education camps have been made since 2017. In addition to working within the camps after release detainees are sent to factories for a mandatory work period often measured in months, people who refuse the forced labor are sent back for additional re-education.

Hukou System 

Hukou is a legal document that contains records of a households basic information. It was introduced over 60 years ago and is an important tool that the government uses to monitor its population. However, many criticize that the hukou system prevents the flow of free labor, leaves workers idling, while sustaining economic losses. More recently China has been trying to reform this system as a response to the criticisms. How the Hukou system works is that each household classifies the residents based on their hometown or where they were born. This especially limits the mobility of Chinese laborers as transference of Hukou is only granted in certain cases or when one fulfills the criteria that the government has set. Usually this includes information regarding one's level of education and technical experience. However, this process becomes more complicated in larger cities as many are trying to find work. This has created an imbalance as many flock towards China's cities. As of 2014 there were over 274 million rural workers in cities which accounts for over 36% of the total workforce . Although these workers are in the city, it is harder for them to find and keep jobs compared to those who hold urban Hukous. This also leads to them not being able to acquire basic social entitlements including their children. However the Chinese government places Hukou reform at the top of their list. This places a rift between the urban hukous and the rural hukou holders as with holding an urban hukou you are offered more opportunities, which would diminish its value if rural hukou owners started to acquire them. However, since 2014 the Chinese government has gradually blurred the lines between urban and rural hukous. China is seeking to also increase the amount of urban residents by granting 100 million urban hukou to rural hukou owners by 2020. Furthermore, China has attempted to lessen the requirements for urban hukou seekers in hopes of obtaining a more mobile workforce while also bringing children out of the countryside at the same time because with the lessened urban hukou requirements more children and families can move into the city for a better life.

See also
China Labour Bulletin
Hukou system

Notes

External links

Text of the Labor Contract Law of the People's Republic of China includes supplementary materials